This list of tallest church buildings ranks church buildings by height. From the Middle Ages until the advent of the skyscraper, Christian church buildings were often the world's tallest buildings. From 1311, when the spire of Lincoln Cathedral surpassed the height of the Great Pyramid of Giza, until the Washington Monument was completed in 1884, a succession of church buildings held this title.

The tallest church building in the world is the Ulm Minster (161.5 m), the main Lutheran congregation in Ulm, Germany. The tallest Catholic, as well as the tallest domed church building, is the Basilica of Our Lady of Peace (158 m) in Yamoussoukro, Ivory Coast. The tallest church building with two steeples as well as the tallest cathedral is Cologne Cathedral (157.4 m) in Cologne, Germany. The tallest Eastern Orthodox, as well as the tallest domed cathedral, will be People's Salvation Cathedral (now 120 m; 127 m when completed) in Bucharest, Romania. The tallest brickwork church building is St Martin's Church (130.6 m) in Landshut, Germany, while the tallest brickwork church building with two steeples is St Mary's Church (125 m) in Lübeck, Germany. The tallest wooden church building is Săpânța-Peri Monastery church (78 m) in Săpânța, Romania. The tallest church building in the Americas is the Cathedral of Maringá (124 m) in Maringá, Brasil.

The city with the most church buildings surpassing  is Hamburg (five of the 28 tallest churches), second is Lübeck (four of the 55 tallest churches), in the Americas it is New York City (two).

Constructed

Church buildings ≥ 100 m (328 ft) 

This list does not include church buildings that incorporate a significant portion of space to non-church uses, such as the Chicago Temple Building. It does not include structures from non-Christian religions.

Overview - church buildings ≥ 100 m (328 ft) - country and city list

Timeline - the tallest church buildings of their time

Church buildings ≥ 75 m (246 ft) ≤ 99.9 m (327 ft) 

Note: The church buildings are ordered based on their tallest recorded height in history. Those  (for "historical") are church buildings no longer in existence (suffix D) or no longer as tall as their previous maximum height (suffix >100 if height today > 100 metres, suffix >75 if height today > 75 metres and suffix <75 if height today below 75 metres). In order to view the tallest present churches in a row click the sorting button in the H column.

Under construction

Historic (church buildings that have since been reduced in size)

See also 
 List of tallest Orthodox church buildings
 List of tallest domes
 List of largest church buildings
 List of highest church naves
 List of tallest crosses
 List of tallest mosques
 List of towers
 List of tallest church buildings in the United Kingdom

References 

History of St. Anthony's Parish, Toledo, Ohio, Anno Domini 1957, F.S. Legowski
NRHP certification #71000424

Churches
Churches, tallest
Lists of churches
Churches, tallest